Minds and Machines is a peer-reviewed academic journal covering artificial intelligence, philosophy, and cognitive science.

The journal was established in 1991 with James Henry Fetzer as founding editor-in-chief. It was published by Kluwer Academic Publishers but was taken over by Springer in 2021 (Springer Science+Business Media). Affiliated with the Society for Machines and Mentality, a special interest group within the International Association for Computing and Philosophy. The current editor-in-chief is Mariarosaria Taddeo (University of Oxford).

Editors
Previous editors-in-chief of the journal have been James H. Fetzer (1991–2000), James H. Moor (2001–2010), and Gregory Wheeler (2011–2016).

Abstracting and indexing 
The journal is abstracted and indexed by the following services:

According to the Journal Citation Reports, the journal has a 2016 impact factor of 0.514.

Article categories 
The journal publishes articles in the categories  Research articles, Reviews,  Critical and discussion exchanges (debates),  Letters to the Editor, and  Book reviews.

Frequently cited articles 
According to the Web of Science, the following five articles have been cited most frequently:

References

External links 
 

Springer Science+Business Media academic journals
Quarterly journals
Computer science journals
Philosophy of mind journals
Publications established in 1991
English-language journals
1991 establishments in the United States